Naoki Sakai may refer to:

Naoki Sakai (footballer), Japanese midfielder
Naoki Sakai (industrial designer), professor and Nissan designer